The Detroit Dragons were a professional hockey team based in Fraser, Michigan. The team was part of the All American Hockey League and started their inaugural season in November 2008. The Dragons played their home games at the Great Lakes Sports Arena until the team folded on January 5, 2009 due to poor ownership and bad finances.

Season-by-season record

Glossary: GP= Games played, W= Wins, L= Losses, OTL= Over Time Losses, SL= Shootout Losses, PTS= Points, PCT= Winning Percentage, GF= Goals For, GA= Goals Against, PIM= Penalty Minutes

External links
 Official AAHL website

Ice hockey teams in Michigan
Macomb County, Michigan
Ice hockey clubs established in 2008
Ice hockey clubs disestablished in 2009
Sports in Metro Detroit
2008 establishments in Michigan
2009 disestablishments in Michigan